Six of the Best was a reunion concert between the rock band Genesis, their original lead singer Peter Gabriel and former guitarist Steve Hackett. It took place on a wet Saturday, 2 October 1982, at the National Bowl in Milton Keynes, Buckinghamshire, England. Genesis were introduced on to the stage by Jonathan King, who discovered and christened the band fifteen years earlier. The support bands were John Martyn, The Blues Band and Talk Talk.

Background
The classic Genesis quintet of Peter Gabriel, Mike Rutherford, Tony Banks, Steve Hackett and Phil Collins became a quartet when lead vocalist Gabriel left Genesis at the end of The Lamb Lies Down on Broadway tour in 1975. After a lengthy search for a new lead singer, the band decided that Collins could take on the role while remaining the band's drummer. For touring, they needed an additional drummer to play while Collins sang. Ex-Yes and King Crimson drummer Bill Bruford joined for their 1976 tour before Chester Thompson took on the role for all future live dates. Lead guitarist Hackett's departure in 1977 made Genesis the trio they remained. In 1978, Daryl Stuermer was recruited as a touring guitarist and bassist on live shows.

Peter Gabriel pursued a successful solo career, releasing four albums between 1977 and 1982. Also in 1982, Gabriel and his company planned and staged the first WOMAD concert. It was a commercial failure, put down to lack of suitable transport to the venue and publicity, and left Gabriel facing financial ruin and considerable personal pressure. At the suggestion of his and Genesis' manager, Tony Smith, he and his ex-band mates agreed to play together for a single show under the name 'Six of the Best'  along with Chester Thompson and Daryl Stuermer.

Genesis were completing their Three Sides Live Encore tour with three concerts at Hammersmith Odeon on 28–30 September. At least one full band rehearsal took place on 29 September at Hammersmith Odeon.

Gabriel opened the show by rising from a coffin carried to the stage by four pallbearers, a stunt that was not known by the other musicians prior to the show. Hackett appeared on stage during the encores after arriving late from South America. Rutherford celebrated his 32nd birthday on the day of the concert and the crowd sang 'Happy Birthday' to him during the show.

The revenues generated by the concert allowed the WOMAD creditors to be paid, the festival to be established and Gabriel to resume his solo career.

Set list
"Back in N.Y.C."
"Dancing with the Moonlit Knight" (intro and first verse only)
"The Carpet Crawlers"
"Firth of Fifth"
"The Musical Box"
"Solsbury Hill"
"Turn It On Again" (vocals: Phil Collins; drums: Peter Gabriel)
"The Lamb Lies Down on Broadway"
"Fly on a Windshield"
"Broadway Melody of 1974"
"In the Cage"
"Supper's Ready"
Encore
"I Know What I Like (In Your Wardrobe)" (guitar: Steve Hackett)
"The Knife" (guitar: Steve Hackett)

Recording
No official recording of the concert has been released but several audience recordings were gathered during 2007 and digitally remastered.

In 2015, Mike Rutherford expressed his regret that the concert had not been filmed.

References

Concerts
Genesis (band)